Jim Hendry MBE (born 10 October 1939) was a Scottish professional cyclist wo rode between 1965 and 1969. Hendry began coaching in the 1960s before holding several voluntary management and coaching positions. He became British Cycling's Director of Racing in 1979 and was responsible for the selection and Management of Great Britain cycling teams. He was appointed British Cycling's Chief Executive in 1988 and was later general secretary. Hendry was made an MBE for his services to cycling in the Queen's Birthday Honours in 2007. He is British Cycling's honorary archivist.

References

1939 births
Living people
English male cyclists
English cycling coaches
Members of the Order of the British Empire
Place of birth missing (living people)